Micrurus altirostris is a species of coral snake in the family Elapidae.

References 

altirostris
Snakes of South America
Reptiles of Argentina
Reptiles of Brazil
Reptiles of Paraguay
Reptiles of Uruguay
Reptiles described in 1835